WQGR (93.7 FM) is a radio station broadcasting an Oldies format. Licensed to North Madison, Ohio, U.S., it serves Lake County in Northeast Ohio as well as Cleveland, Ohio. It is one of five stations in Media One Radio Group's Ashtabula cluster, the others being WFUN (AM), WFXJ-FM, WREO-FM, WYBL (FM), and WZOO-FM.

WQGR went on the air August 1, 2013. Its offices are located in Mentor.

On Monday December 10, 2018 at 6 a.m., "Cougar 93.7 FM" flipped formats from hot AC to oldies as "Gold 93.7 FM" with legendary Cleveland broadcaster Ted Alexander II serving as Program Director.

References

External links
Media One Radio Group Website

QGR
Lake County, Ohio
Oldies radio stations in the United States